1989 was a common year on the Gregorian calendar.

1989 may also refer to:

Albums
 1989 (Taylor Swift album), 2014
 1989 (Ryan Adams album), 2015
 1989, a 1989 album reissued in 2009 by After Crying
 1989, a 2009 album by Jacopo Sarno
 1989, a 2014 album by the Virginia Sil'hooettes
 1989, a 2017 album by Rune Reilly Kölsch
 1989: The Best of Power of Dreams, a 2010 album by Power of Dreams

Songs
 "1989", a song by Clem Snide from the album Your Favorite Music, 1999
 "1989", a song by Less Than Jake from the album Borders & Boundaries, 2000
 "1989", a song by Titiyo from the album Come Along, 2001
 "1989", a song by Mindless Self Indulgence from the album You'll Rebel to Anything, 2005
 "1989", a song by Portugal. The Man from the album Censored Colors, 2008
 "1989", a song by Civet from the album Hell Hath No Fury, 2008
 "1989", a song by the Rakes from the album Klang, 2009
 "1989", a song by Devlin from the album Bud, Sweat and Beers, 2010
 "1989", a song by Chris August from the album The Upside of Down, 2012
 "1989", a 1978 song by Spizzenergi
 "1989", a 2003 song by the Spits
 "1989", a 2010 song by Power of Dreams

See also
 1998 (disambiguation)